Yehuda Boaron is a former Israeli footballer.

References

1965 births
Living people
Israeli footballers
Maccabi Netanya F.C. players
Maccabi Haifa F.C. players
Association footballers not categorized by position